Wendell Scott Walker is an American politician. Since 2020, he has been a Republican member of the Virginia House of Delegates, representing the 23rd district, consisting of parts of the city of Lynchburg, Bedford, and Amherst Counties.

Biography
Walker is a prominent leader in the local Republican party, and has held positions in local and state committees, including the chair of the Lynchburg Republican Committee.

Electoral history

Tenure

Equal Rights Amendment 

During the 2020 regular session, Walker voted yes for the Equal Rights Amendment, which Conservative Activists opposed as it is argued to allow tax-payer funded Abortion Health Care. Walker later claimed he intended to vote nay.

Memorial of Harry F. Byrd 

In early February 2020, Walker proposed a bill to remove a Statue of Harry F. Byrd, a prominent Democrat who is often infamously remembered for his racist opposition to desegregation, in response to efforts from state Democrats to remove more Confederate statues in the state. Such measures were undertaken across the country in the aftermath of the Charleston church shooting in 2015 and they were eventually galvanized in the aftermath of the Unite The Right Rally in 2017. After the Democrats agreed to support his measure to remove the statue which serves as a tribute to Byrd, Walker requested that the state legislature should not consider his own bill. He said that "the reason I put that in was more of a political reason." Walker continued by saying "I think history is very important, whether it’s good, bad or ugly. I was not willing to allow the governor to have the opportunity to remove statues." Even though the Virginia House Rules Committee voted to let the bill go for the day, as opposed to removing it from consideration like Walker had requested, Virginia House Majority Leader Charniele Herring (D) said that she wanted to hear Walker's own reasoning on why he wanted to kill a bill that he himself had introduced for consideration in the state legislature. Two other bills were struck as supplications of their sponsors following the introduction of Walker's bill.

References

Living people
Politicians from Lynchburg, Virginia
Republican Party members of the Virginia House of Delegates
21st-century American politicians
1952 births